Urszula Kozioł  (born 20 June 1931) is a Polish poet. In 2011, she was a recipient of the Silesius Poetry Award.

Biography
Kozioł was born in Rakówka, a village in Poland.  She attended high school in Zamość and graduated from the University of Wroclaw in 1953.

Her debut poetry collection was Gumowe klocki ("Blocks of rubber", 1957), but her second, W rytmie korzeni ("In the Rhythm of the Roots", 1963), is considered her breakthrough.  Of her 1963 poem "Recipe for the Meat Course", translator Karen Kovacik writes that it "functions simultaneously as an ars poetica and an ironic riposte to those who believed a woman's place was in the kitchen" and "depict[s] housework or domestic life through motifs of violence and estrangement."

Her novel Postoje pamięci ("Stations of Memory", 1965) focuses on Mirka, the daughter of a teacher, growing up in a small village during World War II.  In his survey of Polish literature, Czesław Miłosz wrote that it was "One of the most authentic testimonies on the village".

She began editing the magazine Odra in 1968.  She has also written stage and radio dramas for adults and children.

Bibliography

Poetry 
 Gumowe klocki (Związek Literatów Polskich, Oddział we Wrocławiu, 1957)
 W rytmie korzeni (Ossolineum, 1963)
 Smuga i promień (Ludowa Spółdzielnia Wydawnicza, 1965)
 Lista obecności (Ludowa Spółdzielnia Wydawnicza, 1967)
 Poezje wybrane (Ludowa Spółdzielnia Wydawnicza, 1969)
 W rytmie słońca (Wydawnictwo Literackie, 1974)
 Wybór wierszy (Spółdzielnia Wydawnicza "Czytelnik", 1976)
 Poezje wybrane (II) (Ludowa Spółdzielnia Wydawnicza, 1985)
 Wybór wierszy (Spółdzielnia Wydawnicza "Czytelnik", 1986)
 Żalnik (Wydawnictwo Literackie, 1989;)
 Dziesięć lat przed końcem wieku (nakładem autorki; maszynopis powielany, brak daty i miejsca wydania; ok. 1990)
 Postoje słowa (Wydawnictwo Dolnośląskie, 1994)
 Wielka pauza (Wydawnictwo Literackie, 1996)
 W płynnym stanie (Wydawnictwo Literackie, 1998)
 Wiersze niektóre (Bis, 1997, 1998)
 Stany nieoczywistości (Państwowy Instytut Wydawniczy, 1999)
 Supliki (Wydawnictwo Literackie, 2005)
 Przelotem (Wydawnictwo Literackie, 2007)
 Horrendum (Wydawnictwo Literackie, 2010)
 Fuga (1955-2010) (Biuro Literackie, 2011)
 Klangor (Wydawnictwo Literackie, 2014)
 Ucieczki (Wydawnictwo Literackie, 2016)

Prose 
 Postoje pamięci (Ludowa Spółdzielnia Wydawnicza, 1964, 1973, 1977; Atut-Wrocławskie Wydawnictwo Oświatowe 2004).
 Ptaki dla myśli (Ludowa Spółdzielnia Wydawnicza 1971; wyd. 2 poprawione i rozszerzone: Wydawnictwo Literackie 1984)
 Noli me tangere (Państwowy Instytut Wydawniczy 1984)

Essays 
 Z poczekalni oraz Osobnego sny i przypowieści (Wydawnictwo Literackie, 1978)
 Osobnego sny i przypowieści (Okis, 1997; Biblioteka Wrocławskiego Oddziału Stowarzyszenia Pisarzy Polskich)

Drama 
 Gonitwy (Prapremiera: Zespół Teatralny przy Wyższej Szkole Inżynieryjskiej, Rzeszów 1972)
 Kobieta niezależna („Scena” 12/1976)
 Biało i duszno (układ dramatyczny) („Scena” 10/1977)
 Król malowany (na motywach baśni J. Ch. Andersena pt. Nowe szaty króla 1978; druk: Zjednoczone Przedsiębiorstwa Rozrywkowe, Ośrodek Teatru Otwartego „Kalambur”, 1986)
 Narada familijna („Teatr Polskiego Radia” 2/1978)
 Przerwany wykład („Scena” 12/1978)
 Weekend ("Opole" nr 1/1981 i nr 2/1981)
 Spartolino, czyli jak Rzempoła ze szwagrem Pitołą stracha przydybali (Prapremiera: Wrocławski Ośrodek Teatru Otwartego „Kalambur” 1982)
 Trzy Światy (Czytelnik, 1982)
 Podwórkowcy (Prapremiera: Teatr Dramatyczny im. J. Szaniawskiego, Wałbrzych 1983; spektakl TV 1984)
 Psujony ("Scena" 1/1985)
 Magiczne imię (Wydawnictwo Literackie, 1985)

References

Living people
Writers from Wrocław
Polish women poets
University of Wrocław alumni
Polish women dramatists and playwrights
Polish editors
Polish women editors
Polish essayists
Polish women essayists
Polish women novelists
1931 births
20th-century Polish dramatists and playwrights
20th-century Polish novelists
20th-century Polish non-fiction writers
21st-century Polish dramatists and playwrights
21st-century Polish novelists
21st-century Polish poets
21st-century Polish women writers
20th-century Polish women writers